Mollis is a municipality in the canton of Glarus in Switzerland.

Mollis  may also refer to:

People
 A. Ralph Mollis (born 1961), the current Secretary of State of Rhode Island
 Kristi Mollis, American businesswoman and education professional

Other uses
 Mollis (grape), another name for the Spanish wine grape Listan Negro

See also 

 B mollis
 C. mollis (disambiguation)
 D. mollis (disambiguation)
 N. mollis (disambiguation)
 Molli railway
 Mullis (surname)
 Mulli (disambiguation)
 Molle (disambiguation)
 Molles (disambiguation)